National Softball Hall of Fame and Museum is a softball museum located in Oklahoma City's Adventure District. It includes the Don E. Porter Hall of Fame Stadium, home to the  World Cup of Softball and the annual Women's College World Series.

Amateur Softball Association

USA Softball (formerly the Amateur Softball Association) operates the National Softball Hall of Fame and Museum.

British Hall
On 17 February 2007, the British Softball Federation enshrined 12 members into its inaugural Hall of Fame. Members included players Kate Allen, GB manager/player Mark Berman, the late umpire Dave Allen, and Natalie Fox.

See also
National Fastpitch Coaches Association Hall of Fame

References

External links
National Softball Hall of Fame and Museum
 National Softball Hall of Fame and Museum information on TravelOK.com Official travel and tourism website for the State of Oklahoma
 Team Rich Softball

Hall of Fame and Museum
Softball museums and halls of fame
Softball
Sports museums in Oklahoma
Museums in Oklahoma City
Sports in Oklahoma City
Awards established in 1957
Museums established in 1957
1957 establishments in Oklahoma